Nestor Khergiani (born July 20, 1975) is a Georgian judoka. He obtained silver medal at the 2004 Summer Olympics in the -60 kg event where he lost in the final to Tadahiro Nomura. Khergiani won silver in 2007 World Judo Championships and bronze in 1999 World Judo Championships. At the European Judo Championships he won gold in 1998 and 2003, bronze in 1999, 2000, 2001, 2002, 2007, 2008 and 2009.

Khergiani has been a scholarship holder with the Olympic Solidarity program since August 2001.

Achievements

References

External links
 

1975 births
Living people
Male judoka from Georgia (country)
Judoka at the 2000 Summer Olympics
Judoka at the 2004 Summer Olympics
Judoka at the 2008 Summer Olympics
Olympic judoka of Georgia (country)
Olympic silver medalists for Georgia (country)
Olympic medalists in judo
Medalists at the 2004 Summer Olympics